Route 18, or Highway 18, may refer to:

International
 Asian Highway 18
 European route E18 
 European route E018

Argentina

Australia
 Waterfall Way

Canada
 Alberta Highway 18
 British Columbia Highway 18
 Manitoba Highway 18
 Ontario Highway 18 (former)
 Prince Edward Island Route 18
 Saskatchewan Highway 18

China
  G18 Expressway

Costa Rica
 National Route 18

Czech Republic
 I/18 Highway; Czech: Silnice I/18

India
  National Highway 18 (India)

Iran

Ireland
  M18 motorway (Ireland)
  N18 road (Ireland)

Italy
 Autostrada A18
 State road 18

Japan
 Japan National Route 18
 Jōshin-etsu Expressway

Korea, South
 National Route 18

New Zealand 
 New Zealand State Highway 18

Paraguay
 National Route 18

Poland 
  Motorway A18
  National road 18

Russia 
M18 motorway (Russia) running from Saint Petersburg to Murmansk

South Africa
N18 road (South Africa)

Ukraine
 Highway M18 (Ukraine)

United Kingdom
 British A18 (Doncaster-Ludborough)
 British M18 (Thurcroft-Rawcliffe)

United States
 U.S. Route 18
 New England Route 18 (former)
 Alabama State Route 18
 Arkansas Highway 18
 California State Route 18
 County route A18 (California)
 County Route E18 (California)
 County Route G18 (California)
 County Route J18 (California)
 County Route S18 (California)
 Colorado State Highway 18 (pre-1968) (former)
 Delaware Route 18
 Florida State Road 18
 County Road 18 (Bradford County, Florida)
 County Road 18 (Columbia County, Florida)
 County Road 18 (Union County, Florida)
 Georgia State Route 18
 Hawaii Route 18 (former)
 Illinois Route 18
 Indiana State Road 18
 K-18 (Kansas highway)
 Kentucky Route 18
 Louisiana Highway 18
 Maine State Route 18 (former)
 Maryland Route 18
 Massachusetts Route 18
 M-18 (Michigan highway)
 Minnesota State Highway 18
 County Road 18 (Anoka County, Minnesota)
 County Road 18 (Scott County, Minnesota)
 County Road 18 (Washington County, Minnesota)
 Mississippi Highway 18
 Missouri Route 18
 Nebraska Highway 18
 Nevada State Route 18 (former)
 New Hampshire Route 18
 New Jersey Route 18
 New Jersey Route 18N (former)
 County Route 18 (Monmouth County, New Jersey)
 New Mexico State Road 18
 New York State Route 18
 County Route 18 (Allegany County, New York)
 County Route 18 (Chautauqua County, New York)
 County Route 18 (Columbia County, New York)
 County Route 18 (Dutchess County, New York)
 County Route 18 (Erie County, New York)
 County Route 18 (Essex County, New York)
 County Route 18 (Herkimer County, New York)
 County Route 18 (Onondaga County, New York)
 County Route 18 (Ontario County, New York)
 County Route 18 (Orange County, New York)
 County Route 18 (Orleans County, New York)
 County Route 18 (Otsego County, New York)
 County Route 18 (Rensselaer County, New York)
 County Route 18 (Schoharie County, New York)
 County Route 18 (Schuyler County, New York)
 County Route 18 (Steuben County, New York)
 County Route 18 (Suffolk County, New York)
 County Route 18 (Tioga County, New York)
 County Route 18 (Washington County, New York)
 County Route 18 (Westchester County, New York)
 County Route 18 (Yates County, New York)
 North Carolina Highway 18
 North Dakota Highway 18
 Ohio State Route 18
 Oklahoma State Highway 18
 Oklahoma State Highway 18B
 Oregon Route 18
 Pennsylvania Route 18
 South Carolina Highway 18
 South Dakota Highway 18 (former)
 Tennessee State Route 18
 Texas State Highway 18
 Farm to Market Road 18
 Ranch to Market Road 18 (former)
 Utah State Route 18
 Vermont Route 18
 Virginia State Route 18
 Washington State Route 18
 Primary State Highway 18 (Washington) (former)
 West Virginia Route 18
 Wisconsin Highway 18 (former)

Territories
 Guam Highway 18
 Puerto Rico Highway 18

See also
List of A18 roads
List of M18 roads
List of highways numbered 18A
List of highways numbered 18B
List of highways numbered 18C
List of highways numbered 18D
List of highways numbered 18E
List of highways numbered 18F
Highway 18, a Golf Channel series similar to The Amazing Race